Hutch Lake is a man-made lake in northern Alberta, Canada within Mackenzie County.

Hutch Lake was constructed in October 1989, officially opening on June 22, 1990, to fulfill the need for a long-term water source for High Level. The lake features a recreation area, privately owned residential lots and trail systems. The recreation area includes a campground and a day use area and the trails are used for hiking, quadding, skiing and snowmobiling.

See also 
List of lakes of Alberta

References 

Hutch Lake
Reservoirs in Alberta
Mackenzie County